The discography of Canadian pop rock band Faber Drive consists of three studio albums, one extended play, and twelve singles, eleven of which have an accompanying music video. Originally known as Faber, the group added the word Drive due to potential legal issues. They signed a record deal with 604 Records in 2006 after releasing one self-titled extended play independently and all of their studio recordings have been released under that record label in partnership with Universal Republic Records.

Their first two albums collectively produced five top 40 singles on the Canadian Hot 100, including one top 10 (2009's "G-Get Up and Dance"). "Tongue Tied" and "When I'm with You" have both been certified Gold by Music Canada, while "Dance" and "Give Him Up" have both been certified Platinum. Despite this success with singles, none of their albums have impacted the Billboard album charts.

Studio albums

Extended plays

Singles

Promotional singles

Other charted songs

Music videos

References

Notes

Citations

Discographies of Canadian artists
Rock music group discographies